Glenbrook is an unincorporated community in Benton County, Oregon, United States. Glenbrook lies on Alpine Road west of Alpine and south of Dawson.

Unincorporated communities in Benton County, Oregon
Unincorporated communities in Oregon